Pouteria nemorosa is a species of plant in the family Sapotaceae. It is endemic to Bolivia.

References

Flora of Bolivia
nemorosa
Vulnerable plants
Taxonomy articles created by Polbot
Taxa named by Charles Baehni